Pseudomonas alkanolytica is a Gram-negative soil bacterium that produces Coenzyme A. Because this organism is patented, it is not officially recognized as a legitimate Pseudomonas species, and therefore has no type strain. However, it is available through the American Type Culture Collection.

References

Pseudomonadales
Bacteria described in 1972